The U.S. Post Office, Courthouse, and Customhouse in Biloxi, Mississippi, also known as Biloxi City Hall, was built in 1908.  It was designed by James Knox Taylor in Classical Revival style.  It served as a courthouse and as a post office, and was listed on the National Register of Historic Places in 1978, when it was being used as Biloxi's city hall.

It served the United States District Court for the Southern District of Mississippi during 1908–1959.

Its first floor was renovated in 1960 and 1964 to be used as City Hall.

See also
List of United States federal courthouses in Mississippi

References

Neoclassical architecture in Mississippi
Government buildings completed in 1908
Courthouses on the National Register of Historic Places in Mississippi
Post office buildings on the National Register of Historic Places in Mississippi
Buildings and structures in Biloxi, Mississippi
National Register of Historic Places in Harrison County, Mississippi
Custom houses on the National Register of Historic Places
1908 establishments in Mississippi